Khowshabad or Khvoshabad or Khushabad, also rendered as Khosh Abad, may refer to:
 Khvoshabad, Ardabil
 Khvoshabad, Fars
 Khvoshabad, Hamadan
 Khvoshabad, Hormozgan
 Khowshabad, Isfahan
 Khvoshabad, Razavi Khorasan
 Khowshabad, South Khorasan